The Wedding Trip is a 1969 German-Italian comedy film directed by Ralf Gregan and starring Liselotte Pulver, Dieter Hallervorden and Ewa Strömberg.

Synopsis
After seven years of marriage a German couple finally go on their honeymoon to Rome, but the trip is beset by problems.

Cast
 Liselotte Pulver as Hannelore Schmidt
 Dieter Hallervorden as Lukas Andreas Martin Schmidt
 Ewa Strömberg as Kay
 Memmo Carotenuto as Arturo Santoni
 Alberto Farnese as Rossano Bertorelli
 Angelo Sorrentini as Galoppini
 Armando Carini as Hotelboy Pepino
 Dieter Hallervorden Jr. as Angelo Galoppini

References

Bibliography 
 Bock, Hans-Michael & Bergfelder, Tim. The Concise CineGraph. Encyclopedia of German Cinema. Berghahn Books, 2009.

External links 
 

1969 films
1969 comedy films
German comedy films
West German films
1960s German-language films
Films directed by Ralf Gregan
Italian comedy films
Films about vacationing
1960s German films
1960s Italian films